Scarites striatus  is a species of beetles of the family Carabidae.

Description

Distribution
This species occurs in Tunisia.

References
 Universal Biological Indexer
 Biolib
 Scarites

striatus
Beetles described in 1825